is a passenger railway station operated by the Takamatsu-Kotohira Electric Railroad in Takamatsu, Kagawa, Japan.  It is operated by the private transportation company Takamatsu-Kotohira Electric Railroad (Kotoden) and is designated station "K03". The station name is taken from the nearby Ritsurin Garden.

Lines
Ritsurin-Kōen Station is a station on the Kotoden Kotohira Line and is located 2.9 km from the terminus of the line at Takamatsu-Chikkō Station.

Layout
The station consists of two opposed side platforms connected by a  level crossing.

Adjacent stations

History
Ritsurin-Kōen Station opened on December 21, 1926 as a station of the Kotohira Electric Railway. On November 1, 1943 it became  a station on the Takamatsu Kotohira Electric Railway Kotohira Line due to a company merger.

Surrounding area
Ritsurin Park
Takamatsu Ritsurin Elementary School

Passenger statistics

See also
 List of railway stations in Japan

References

External links

  

Railway stations in Japan opened in 1926
Railway stations in Takamatsu